Lieutenant (Lt) is a junior officer rank in the British Army and Royal Marines. It ranks above second lieutenant and below captain and has a NATO ranking code of OF-1 and it is the senior subaltern rank. Unlike some armed forces which use first lieutenant, the British rank is simply lieutenant, with no ordinal attached. The rank is equivalent to that of a flying officer in the Royal Air Force (RAF). Although formerly considered senior to a Royal Navy (RN) sub-lieutenant, the British Army and Royal Navy ranks of lieutenant and sub-lieutenant are now considered to be of equivalent status. The Army rank of lieutenant has always been junior to the Navy's rank of lieutenant.

Usage 
In the 21st-century British Army, the rank is ordinarily held for up to three years. A typical appointment for a lieutenant might be the command of a platoon or troop of approximately thirty soldiers.

Before 1871, when the whole British Army switched to using the current rank of "lieutenant", the Royal Artillery, Royal Engineers and Fusilier regiments used "first lieutenant" and "second lieutenant".

Form of address 
In the United Kingdom, "Lieutenant" is a rank which is not used as a form of address, unlike "Captain" and higher ranks. A Lieutenant called Smith is addressed and referred to as "Mr Smith". Its origin is in the form of address of the lowest rank of Gentlemen, which originates in Master (or Mistress for women) who were a social rank that held servants but also engaged in household duties themselves. This placed the 'Master' and 'Mistress' above the Goodman and Goodwife, who held no servants and performed all household duties themselves, and below the Lord and Lady, who performed no household duties as all tasks were taken by servants.

Historical insignia 
From 1856 to 1880 a lieutenant's rank insignia was worn on the collar and comprised a single crown, the current insignia for a major.  In 1881 lieutenants had their insignia changed to single pip and moved to the shoulder.  In 1902 they received a second pip, the badge of rank which has been kept to the present.

During the First World War, some officers took to wearing similar jackets to the men, with the rank badges on the shoulder, as the cuff badges made them conspicuous to snipers. This practice was frowned on outside the trenches but was given official sanction in 1917 as an alternative, being made permanent in 1920 when the cuff badges were abolished.  The cuff badges were:

From 1 April 1918 to 31 July 1919, the Royal Air Force maintained the rank of Lieutenant. It was superseded by the rank of flying officer on the following day.

See also

British and U.S. military ranks compared
British Army Other Ranks rank insignia
British Army officer rank insignia

References

Military ranks of the British Army
Military ranks of the Royal Marines
Former military ranks of the Royal Air Force